Calcot is a settlement in the English county of Gloucestershire.

Calcot forms part of the civil parish of Coln St Dennis, within the Cotswold local government district.

References

Hamlets in Gloucestershire
Cotswold District